The 2023 Money in the Bank is the upcoming 14th annual Money in the Bank professional wrestling pay-per-view (PPV) and livestreaming event produced by the American promotion WWE. It will be held for wrestlers from the promotion's Raw and SmackDown brand divisions. The event will take place on Saturday, 1 July 2023 at The O2 Arena in London, England. This will be the first Money in the Bank to be held outside of the United States as well as WWE's first major event to be held in London since Insurrextion in May 2002 and England in general since Insurrextion in June 2003. It will also be the first Money in the Bank to livestream on Binge in Australia.

Production

Background 

Money in the Bank is an annual gimmick event, produced by the American promotion WWE since 2010, generally held between May and July. Along with WrestleMania, Royal Rumble, SummerSlam, and Survivor Series, it is considered one of the promotion's five biggest events of the year, referred to as the "Big Five". The concept of the event comes from WWE's established Money in the Bank ladder match, in which multiple wrestlers use ladders to retrieve a briefcase hanging above the ring. The briefcase contains a contract that guarantees the winner a match for a championship of their choosing at any time within the next year.

Following the success of Clash at the Castle in September 2022, which was held in Cardiff, Wales, WWE announced on 5 January 2023 that they would be returning to the United Kingdom for the 14th Money in the Bank event. It  held on Saturday, 1 July 2023 at The O2 Arena in London, England and feature wrestlers from the Raw and SmackDown brand divisions. This marks the first Money in the Bank event to be held outside of the United States. This will also be WWE's first major event to be held in London since Insurrextion in May 2002 and England in general since Insurrextion in June 2003. In addition to airing on pay-per-view worldwide and the livestreaming services Peacock in the United States and the WWE Network in most international markets, it will be the first Money in the Bank to livestream on Binge in Australia after the Australian version of the WWE Network merged under Foxtel's channel Binge in January. It was also announced that the 30 June episode of Friday Night SmackDown would air live from the same venue, marking the first time for the show to broadcast live and in primetime from the UK at 8pm local on BT Sport. Tickets for both events went on sale on 24 February with hospitality packages also available. It was reported that general admission tickets for Money in the Bank sold out in one minute.

Storylines 
The event will include matches that result from scripted storylines, where wrestlers portray heroes, villains, or less distinguishable characters in scripted events that build tension and culminate in a wrestling match or series of matches. Results are predetermined by WWE's writers on the Raw and SmackDown brands, while storylines are produced on WWE's weekly television shows, Monday Night Raw and Friday Night SmackDown.

References

External links 

2023
2023 WWE Network events
2023 WWE pay-per-view events
Events in London
July 2023 events in the United Kingdom
Professional wrestling in England
2023 in London
Scheduled professional wrestling shows